The Enclave is a fictional organization appearing in American comic books published by Marvel Comics. Typically depicted as a group of dictatorially-minded scientists, the Enclave is best known for creating the characters Adam Warlock and Kismet.

Publication history

The Enclave first appeared in Fantastic Four #66 and were created by Stan Lee and Jack Kirby.

Fictional organization history
The organization that would eventually become known as the Enclave was founded by four world-class scientists (each with a different area of expertise): Dr. Jerome Hamilton, Maris Morlak, Professor Wladyslav Shinski, and Carlo Zota. The organization's goal was to use advanced technology to establish a benevolent world dictatorship under the rule of the scientists. The four scientists successfully faked their deaths and disappeared from society, founding the Citadel of Science (a.k.a. the "Beehive"); on an island in the North Atlantic Ocean, using their technology and abandoned Deviant technology they had found. Their operations were initially funded by their fortunes, and they hired mercenaries as additional personnel as needed. The scientists began their advanced scientific research and development, achieving various scientific breakthroughs and creating many advanced inventions. Before long, their level of technology was more advanced than most known on Earth.

The scientists' first significant accomplishment was the creation of the superhumanly powerful humanoid being they referred to as  "Him" (who would one day become known as Adam Warlock) in an attempt to "create a perfect race of human beings "without evil - without sin." Soon losing control of "Him," the scientists abducted Alicia Masters to sculpt his likeness as this would help them regain control in an unspecified way and would be immune to Him's "blinding power" due to her blindness. Alicia reached "Him" as he was about to emerge from a cocoon in his final metamorphosis. The Fantastic Four discovered the scientists' existence and came to rescue Alicia wrecking the citadel as they battle its security forces. Jerome Hamilton was killed by falling debris as a result of energy bursts that were released by the emergence of Him from the cocoon. The citadel is destroyed when Him builds up enough energy to escape.

The scientists, despite their failure with “Him” or the death of Hamilton, created another superhumanly powerful humanoid they called "Paragon" (who would later become known as Her and Kismet). Although they enlisted Doctor Strange to perform brain surgery on Paragon, they also lost control of her, and she destroyed the rebuilt citadel. The scientists battled the Hulk, Doctor Strange, and Paragon before she departed.

Taking the name Enclave, the scientists financed Security College in New York State in an information-gathering scheme. They hired Monocle (Michael Berman) to acquire students' industrial, military, and political information. However, they uncovered the Security College operation, and the Human Torch and Spider-Man defeated Monocle. Monocle was later killed by the Enclave, who soon abandoned the operation, but learned of the Inhumans.

The Enclave soon abducted Medusa, made an alliance with Maximus, and successfully infiltrated Attilan as part of an attempt to conquer the Inhumans' Great Refuge. The Enclave then attacked the Inhumans, but were betrayed by Maximus and defeated. With Maximus again, they launched an attack on Earth from Attilan in an attempt to foment war between Earth and the Inhumans. This plan failed, and they instead battled the Avengers and Inhumans. Morlak and Zota were captured and imprisoned.

Morlak and Zota were later freed from prison by Shinski. All three were injured in an airplane crash, captured, and hospitalized.

The Enclave obtained both financial backing and an agent named Frank as an assistant from A.I.M. In exchange, they were to capture Kismet and turn her over to A.I.M. Shinski suffered a stroke and he required intravenous therapy after suffering heart and lung damage. The Enclave rebuilt their Transfer Grid in a new base somewhere in the American Midwest. Morlak and Zota traveled to Project Pegasus using the Transfer Grid to obtain a cocoon containing a healing Kismet. After removing Kismet from the cocoon, they used the cocoon to cure Shinsky. Shinsky was overjoyed to see Kismet, but Morlak and Zota planned to extract some of Kismet's DNA to give themselves superhuman powers. Morlak and Zota intended to betray A.I.M. once they gained their superpowers, but Frank assaulted them to stop their plans. Kismet stopped Frank from killing Shinsky, only for Frank to reveal that he was really an Adaptoid and took on Paragon's form and powers. As Kismet and the Adaptoid fight, Shinski infected and destroyed Paragon with a genetic virus. Kismet then made more cocoons to heal Shinski, Morlak, and Zota, and decided to stay with them to nurture them back to health.

Some time later, Shinkski, Morlak, and Zota were transformed into powerful superhumans just as they had hoped. Now, their advanced minds focused on helping humanity rather than conquering the world, although they differed on how to best achieve this goal. They found that they could not travel very far from each other without suffering power loss and great pain. The Enclave tested their powers through actions such as stopping a tornado, saving dying patients, bringing rain to a drought region, curing deadly jungle diseases, disposing of nuclear wastes, and revitalizing rainforests. Their actions brought about long-term effects that they were unaware of, and some places suffered even worse fates due to the Enclave's over-compensations. Although Kismet tried to stop them, their actions caused a volcano to erupt, but they averted disaster with her aid. They accepted Kismet's advice to learn more about their powers by investigating their source, and Kismet accompanied the Enclave into space. They encountered Khatylis during a battle against the Silver Surfer, and the Enclave attacked Khatylis who quickly destroyed them. Kismet caused a dangerous inter-dimensional rift by attacking Khatylis, but Khatylis healed the rift before they were all destroyed, and restored Kismet, Silver Surfer, and the Enclave.

The Enclave's superhuman powers eventually faded. The Enclave later hired Tinkerer to repair their Transfer Grid in order to get their operations running again.

The Enclave operated out of a building in the South Bronx where they have implanted control chips in criminals to use as drones. They also created a robot called Remote which they used to acquire technologies from other companies. While looting Micron Labs, Remote killed a security guard and his silhouette made others think that Spider-Man was responsible. Spider-Man and the Thunderbolts came to investigate, with the Thunderbolts following Remote back to the Enclave and Spider-Man following them. The Enclave completed the Transfer Grid and the Bio-Modem (a beam that would be able to control the minds of others). When the heroes arrived, the Enclave used the Bio-Modem on them. Spider-Man and MACH-I set up interference to the Bio-Modem's power which freed the others. The heroes then destroy Remote and the Enclave fled through the Transfer Grid taking the Transfer Grid and their equipment with them.

Morlak and Shinski created a device to usurp the creative genius of Mister Fantastic to advance their efforts to bio-engineer the human race. They travel to the Tibetan monastery of the Tibetan "Monks of Doom" (the sect that had constructed Doctor Doom's armor) and slaughtered many of the monks, enslaving the rest of the monks to forge a pair of armor suits.

Reporter Isabel Aguirre and photographer Gordon Clay traveled to the monastery to learn why these monks associated with Doctor Doom. They found the monks slaughtered and also find the armored Crucible. Crucible forced Aguirre and Clay on a plane and they are flown to Europe while Crucible states that he was the crucible from which would a new world would be formed. Crucible transformed them into stone gargoyles to smuggle them through immigration. In Stockholm, Sweden, Crucible restored them to life, and coerced them into serving him or risk being turned back into stone gargoyles. Crucible then attacked a science symposium to draw out Mister Fantastic. While using a decoy device disguised as a bomb to draw away the Thing, Crucible fought Reed Richards and activated a device that would drain his inventive genius and transfer it into himself before escaping.

Morlak and Shinski relocate to Genosha and began using the war-torn nation to test their weapons and tactics, gathering and experimenting on the Genoshan people in hopes of transforming them into a master race. The two captured Kismet and brainwashed her into serving them. They altered her appearance and powers, and renamed her Ayesha. The Genoshan government sent Trapster to capture Mister Fantastic not knowing that Crucible had stolen Mister Fantastic's inventive genius. The remaining members of the Fantastic Four followed Mister Fantastic's kidnappers to Genosha only to be defeated by Ayesha. She brought them to Crucible who swapped their minds with that of Crucible's three Genoshan accomplices. The powerless heroes escaped from Crucible, but when one of the Genoshans tried to use Human Torch's powers it resulted in an explosion that destroyed the several top floors of a building which killed some civilians. The powerless heroes reunited with Mister Fantastic. Along with Genoshan Chief Magistrate Anderson, the four storm Crucible's base. Thing, Invisible Woman, and Human Torch fought their super-powered counterparts and reclaimed their bodies. Mister Fantastic entered the inner sanctum and discovered the Genoshans that the Enclave were experimenting on. Morlak revealed his face and confronted Mister Fantastic but Morlak became overwhelmed under the stress of the influx of ideas from Mister Fantastic's stolen inventive genius. Shinski appeared in the Crucible armor and apparently killed Morlak, who died happily released from the torment of seeing the world's fate. Shinski pronounced Morlak unworthy of claiming the cosmos and serving as Ayesha's consort, naming himself the true Crucible with Morlak as his lackey. Mister Fantastic was able to stun Crucible and flee with the rest of the repowered Fantastic Four. Crucible found Ayesha but Genoshan Chief Magistrate Anderson surprised both of them with a black hole generator creating a miniature black hole that pulled all three of them in.

The Enclave (with Shinski and Morlak turning up alive) posed as the motion picture company Beehive Productions hiring a young intern named Danny to design a female "Warlock" as a movie character. They created a fail-safe program to gain better control of her. Adam Warlock apparently sensed this new developing being and uploaded a scenario into her to teach her a sense of right and wrong, which allowed her to resist the Enclave's control and escape.

The Enclave later obtained Korvac where they gave him the code name of Adam IV. He was originally supposed to be used by Enclave in their plans for world domination only for Korvac to break free from them and called them arrogant for not planning for a better universe.

Members
 Dr. Jerome Hamilton - An American medical biologist. He was killed by Adam Warlock.
 Maris Morlak - A Lithuanian nuclear physicist. He briefly possessed cosmic power on the same level as Kismet and the Silver Surfer. He could rearrange matter, manipulate energy, manipulate weather, fly, survive in space, and project energy bolts.
 Professor Wladyslav Shinski - A Polish geneticist. He briefly possessed cosmic power on the same level as Kismet and Silver Surfer. He could rearrange matter, manipulate energy, manipulate weather, fly, survive in space, and project energy bolts.
 Carlo Zota - A Spanish electronics technician. He briefly possessed cosmic power on the same level as Kismet and Silver Surfer. He could rearrange matter, manipulate energy, manipulate weather, fly, survive in space, and project energy bolts.

Crucible
Crucible is the supervillain identity used by Maris Morlak and Professor Wladyslav Shinski, two members of the Enclave. Crucible went after Mister Fantastic in a plot to steal his inventive genius and kick-start the Enclave's genetics program. They wore identical suits of power armor, forged by the same monks who forged Doctor Doom's armor, which have the ability to transmute the shape and composition of materials.

Other groups

Asmodeus-worshipping Enclave
Another, unrelated Enclave in Marvel Comics first appeared in the pages of The Tomb of Dracula vol. 2 #2 in Dec. 1979. The group consisted of Damian Burnemissza, Druig, Satas, Kirk Druker, and Sondra. This Enclave was an organization of occultists dedicated to the worship of the demon Asmodeus. They were enemies of the Dimensional Man and Dracula. This group was created by Marv Wolfman and Steve Ditko.

Other versions

Ultimate Marvel
In the Ultimate Extinction miniseries in the Ultimate Marvel universe, it was revealed that a group of scientists rented a radio telescope, applied their own algorithms to it, and were able to see a 'processional entity' (the creature known as Gah Lak Tus) which would arrive within 20 years. To fight the entity when it arrived, they hired Heather Douglas, a contract killer, cloned her, and raised the clones to be an army against Gah-Lak-Tus. The clones refer to the scientists as 'the Enclave', but it also operates as the Paragon Corporation.<ref>Ultimate Extinction #1-5. Marvel Comics.</ref>

In other media
The Enclave appear in The Incredible Hulk'' video game. They are a powerful and secret organization of four, mysterious scientists divided into four sectors that are codenamed Ceres, Minerva, Vulcan, and Jupiter, each one with their own private army, territory, and research focus. Their leaders hide their identities in full body armor and referred to only as Ceres Leader (voiced by Simbi Khali Williams), Jupiter Leader (voiced by S. Scott Bullock), Minerva Leader (voiced by Courtenay Taylor), and Vulcan Leader (voiced by Dave Wittenberg). Vulcan Sector is the mechanical division, Ceres Sector is the chemical weapon and genetics division, Minerva Sector is the psych-ops branch, and Jupiter Sector does weather manipulation. The Enclave build technology which they test on the people of Manhattan, showing total disregard for human life. Their troops consist of normal Legionnaires, flying Centurions, and Barbaria mutants, all equipped with weapons that get more advanced as the story progresses. They also use other weapons like laser turrets, Enclave swarms, scarab robots, missiles, flying dropships to deploy said troops and weapons, and giant Kyklops robots in New York City. Hulk first meets an Enclave assault group attacking the city and trying to silence Rick Jones, who knows too much about them, saving his life and working together to stop their plans. Around the city, the Enclave hide in buildings with the "Paragon Corporation" front and research labs protected by force fields, and regularly send assault groups to test their weapons and devices on the people of Manhattan. They launch many schemes in the story, like using engines that drain life energy to power their devices, chemical bomb attacks to seize territory, building a massive mind control device, stealing high technology from the Army, and trying to eliminate the Hulk using Bi-Beast and other weapons. Later, Hulk secretly helps General Ross destroy an Enclave base at Betty's request, stops them from stealing Hulkbuster armors from the Army, and helps a Hulkbuster overload their F-Pod weapon they unleashed to destroy the city. When the Enclave unleash a bioweapon, Hulk takes Samuel Sterns to destroy it by testing their cure on the infection. After all of their schemes are thwarted, they decide they need to take a more active, personal role in fighting the Hulk, while hoping that the Army does their work for them until the end of the story.
Bonus missions in the game involve wiping out all four sectors and defeating their leaders. The Hulk attacks a single sector in three phases. In the last phases, that sector's leader will personally fight the Hulk. In battle, each leader's armored suit lets them fly and grants superhuman strength and durability matching the Hulk. They are also armed with powerful war hammers that harness and project energy and make use of their own special attacks. Vulcan Leader attacks with satellite lasers, Ceres Leader summons weaker Bi-Beast androids, Minerva Leader uses illusionary copies to distract Hulk while she recovers health, and Jupiter Leader will call lightning strikes.

References

External links
 Enclave at Marvel.com
 Enclave at Marvel Wiki
 
 Enclave at MarvelDirectory.com

 

Characters created by Jack Kirby
Characters created by Stan Lee
Fictional organizations